Road Rage is the title of an audiobook published in February 2009 by HarperAudio. 

It combines two short stories: Richard Matheson's Duel and its homage called Throttle written by Stephen King and his son Joe Hill (writer). 

Both stories of the audiobook are read by the American actor Stephen Lang.

Information
Throttle originally appeared in He Is Legend, a book collecting short stories that are inspired by the work of Richard Matheson.
The CDs are tracked as follows:
 CD 1: Duel (Tracks 1 - 7); Throttle -beginning (Tracks 8+9)
 CD 2: Rest of Throttle (Tracks 1 - 7); Credits (Track 8)

Audiobooks by title or series
HarperCollins books
2009 books